"A View of the Woods" is a short story by Flannery O'Connor. It was completed in the fall of 1956 and was first published in the Fall 1957 issue of Partisan Review. It was later republished in The Best American Short Stories of 1958, and again in 1965, in O'Connor's short story collection, Everything That Rises Must Converge. O'Connor had first submitted it to Harper's Bazaar, although she correctly expected that the story was "a little grim" for the Harper's readership and would be rejected. A devout Roman Catholic, O'Connor often used religious themes in her work; "A View of the Woods" contains numerous references to the Christian tradition. It explores the ideas of modernism and materialism pitted against salvation.

Plot summary 
The main characters of the story are seventy-nine-year-old Grandfather Fortune, a successful landowner, and his favorite granddaughter, Mary Fortune Pitts, who is said to resemble him and he believes that she shares his business acumen. The grandfather is at the very least ambivalent toward his own daughter and dislikes his son-in-law, Pitts, but allows them to reside on a piece of his property. When the grandfather sells parcels of his land for development, he intentionally irritates his son-in-law Pitts on every occasion. The grandfather is in return frustrated every time Pitts takes Mary Fortune to the woods to beat her with a belt and tells her that she should not be so compliant. Eventually, Fortune decides to sell a parcel of land where Pitts grazes his calves for a gas station, and, in doing so, would obstruct their view of the woods. Fortune sells the land to a serpent-like man named Tilman, despite Mary Fortune's attempts to dissuade him from doing so. After Mary Fortune continually irritates her grandfather, he attempts to punish her, but she attacks him and says that she is entirely a Pitts, not a Fortune. In response, the grandfather smashes her head against the rocks, killing her, and then presumably suffers a heart attack as he looks out at a bulldozer developing his land.

References

Short stories by Flannery O'Connor
1957 short stories
Southern Gothic short stories